The Schock 34 PC (Performance Cruiser) is an American sailboat that was designed by Bruce Nelson and Bruce Marek as a racer-cruiser and first built in 1986.

The boat is a cruising development of the lightweight racing Schock 34 GP with an  heavier hull and a  shorter mast.

Production
The design was built by W. D. Schock Corp in the United States. A total of 40 boats were built, between 1986 and 1990, but it is now out of production.

Design
The Schock 34 GP is a recreational keelboat, built predominantly of fiberglass over a balsa core. It has a masthead sloop rig, a raked stem , a reverse transom, an internally mounted spade-type rudder controlled by a wheel and a fixed fin keel. It displaces  and carries  of ballast.

The design has sleeping accommodation for seven people, with a double "V"-berth in the bow cabin, a drop-down dinette table and a straight settee in the main cabin and an aft cabin with a double berth on the port side. The galley is located on the starboard side just forward of the companionway ladder. The galley is "L"-shaped and is equipped with a two-burner stove, ice box and a sink. A navigation station is opposite the galley, on the starboard side. The head is located just aft of the bow cabin on the port side and includes a shower.

Operational history
In a 1987 review in Yachting magazine Chris Caswell wrote, "[Instead of the 34-GP], choose the 34-PC (Performance Cruiser), however, and you get the identical hull, with its elliptical keel and balsa coring, but you'd never recognize the two boats as sisters. A full-length cabin, spacious cockpit with wheel steering, and fold-down swim steps make this a Ferrari in Cadillac clothing, lying in wait for some unsuspecting sailor to challenge in an informal afternoon race. One intriguing option is a shoal-draft wing keel, which lops two feet off the draft as well as stiffening the boat up with its ballasted wings. Below, the 34-PC is pure luxury, with a spacious owner's stateroom aft, a private cabin forward with enclosed head, and a teak-lined saloon with twin settees and a large galley."

See also
List of sailing boat types

Related development
 Schock 34 GP

References

External links
Photo of a Schock 34 PC

Keelboats
1980s sailboat type designs
Sailing yachts
Sailboat type designs by Bruce Nelson
Sailboat type designs by Bruce Marek
Sailboat types built by W. D. Schock Corp